Veriora Parish was a rural municipality of Estonia, in Põlva County. It had a population of 1350 (as of 2017) and an area of 200.37 km². In 2017, Veriora Parish, Räpina Parish and Meeksi Parish were merged and a new municipality Räpina Parish was formed.

Settlements
Small borough
Veriora
Villages
Haavapää - Himmiste - Jõevaara - Jõeveere - Kikka - Kirmsi - Koolma - Koolmajärve - Kullamäe - Kunksilla - Laho - Leevi - Lihtensteini - Männisalu - Mõtsavaara - Nohipalo - Pahtpää - Sarvemäe - Soohara - Süvahavva - Timo - Väike-Veerksu - Vändra - Vareste - Verioramõisa - Viira - Viluste - Vinso - Võika

References

Former municipalities of Estonia
Põlva County